Chinaza Love Uchendu  (born 3 December 1997) is a Nigerian international footballer who plays as a forward. She is a member of the Nigeria women's national football team. At a club level she played for Rivers Angels before moving to Braga in Portugal.

Football career

Uchendu played for Rivers Angels in the Nigeria Women Premier League from the start of 2017 until July 2018 after that she transferred with help of to Braga in Portugal.

International career

During the 2018 Africa Women Cup of Nations Uchendu only played the final, where she was subbed in 8 minutes before the end of the extra time. She scored one of the four penalties in the penalty shootout that brought the Nigeria women's national football team the championship.

References

External links
 
 Profile at S.C. Braga 

Living people
Nigerian women's footballers
1997 births
Rivers Angels F.C. players
Nigeria women's international footballers
Nigerian expatriate sportspeople in Portugal
Expatriate women's footballers in Portugal
Nigerian expatriate women's footballers
Campeonato Nacional de Futebol Feminino players
S.C. Braga (women's football) players
Sportspeople from Lagos
Women's association football midfielders
2019 FIFA Women's World Cup players
Damallsvenskan players
Linköpings FC players